Birur may refer to:

Concepts
Birur (Kabbalah) (Beirur/Birurim), in Lurianic Kabbalah Jewish mysticism, "sifting" of physicality to redeem sparks of holiness

Places
Birur, town in Chikkamagaluru district in the state of Karnataka, India